Insurgency in the Republic of Macedonia (22 January–12 November 2001)
 Vejce massacre (28 April 2001)
 Kondovo Crisis (1 July–December 2004)
 Smilkovci lake killings (12 April 2012)
 Skopje government attack (28 October 2014)
 Goshince attack (21 April 2015)
 Kumanovo shootings (9 May 2015)

See also
Radical Islamism and Islamic terrorism in the Balkans

North Macedonia
Terrorist incidents